Primula parryi, or Parry's primrose, is a herbaceous perennial native to wet areas from the subalpine zone to alpine tundra in the Rocky Mountains from Montana to Arizona and New Mexico.

Flowers are magenta with yellow eyes. In the high mountains, they bloom in summer; at lower elevations, in late spring.

The whole plant has a skunklike smell.

Asa Gray named Parry's primrose for Charles Christopher Parry, who discovered it in 1861. Parry had previously named Grays Peak after him.

References

External links

Southwest Colorado Wildflowers

parryi
Flora of the Western United States
Flora of the Rocky Mountains
Plants described in 1862
Taxa named by Asa Gray
Flora without expected TNC conservation status